Alejo Domingo Russell (9 September 1916 – 25 May 1977) was an Argentine tennis player who competed in the 1930s, 1940s and 1950s. He reached the quarterfinals of the U.S. National Championships in 1942 and 1945 and was a finalist in the mixed doubles in 1942 (partnering Patricia Todd).

Grand Slam finals

Mixed doubles: (1 runners-up)

References

External links

Alejo Russell: the "great gentleman" of the courts (article in Spanish)

Argentine male tennis players
Pan American Games medalists in tennis
1916 births
1977 deaths
Pan American Games gold medalists for Argentina
Pan American Games silver medalists for Argentina
Pan American Games bronze medalists for Argentina
Tennis players at the 1951 Pan American Games
Tennis players at the 1955 Pan American Games
Medalists at the 1951 Pan American Games
Sportspeople from Córdoba, Argentina